VLA or vla may refer to:

Organizations
 Vermont Library Association, professional  organization for librarians from Vermont
 Veterinary Laboratories Agency, a UK government agency for researching animal and public health
 Victoria Legal Aid, an Australian Government agency supplying legal assistance to financially disadvantaged persons in the state of Victoria
 Victorian Legislative Assembly, the lower house of the State Parliament of Victoria, Australia
 Virginia Library Association, professional  organization for librarians from Virginia
 Volunteer Lawyers for the Arts, any of a number of organizations providing pro bono legal assistance to members of the arts community

Science and technology
 Very Large Array, a radio telescope array in the US
 Variable-length array, a dynamically-sized data structure in several programming languages

Other uses
 EASA CS-VLA, the European Aviation Safety Agency certification specification for Very Light Aircraft
 RUM-139 VL-ASROC (Vertical Launch ASROC), an anti-submarine weapon of the US Navy
 The VLA, a band, performers of the title sequence for the television series Damages
 Vla, a Dutch custard-like dairy product typically eaten for dessert